This is a list of known episodes of The Avengers radio series, broadcast between 6 December 1971 and 28 December 1973 on Springbok Radio, a commercial service of the South African Broadcasting Corporation. By contrast with the 1965–69 seasons of the British television series from which the series was adapted by Tony Jay and Denis Folbigge, the character Emma Peel occurs throughout.

See also 
 The Avengers radio series

References

External links
 The Radio Series – A Guide to the Serials
 The Avengers
 Review: The Avengers on Radio

Episodes
Lists of British action television series episodes
Lists of British espionage television series episodes
Lists of British crime television series episodes